Events in the year 2011 in Liberia.

Incumbents 

 President: Ellen Johnson Sirleaf
 Vice President: Joseph Boakai
 Chief Justice: Johnnie Lewis

Events
 July 26 — Voinjama businesswoman Garmai Estella Korboi serves the national Independence Day orator.
 August 23 — The constitutional referendum is held, where proposed amendments seeking to change details about elections ultimately fail to be adopted.
 October 7 — President Sirleaf and activist Leymah Gbowee are awarded the Nobel Peace Prize.
 October 11 — The Liberian general election is held.
 November 7 — Police fire upon a march by the opposition party, the Congress for Democratic Change, with the United Nations reporting two deaths.
 November 8 — The presidential run-off election is held.

 November 15 — President Sirleaf is declared the winner of the 2011 presidential election by the National Elections Commission.

Deaths
 February 28 – Ernest Eastman, former Minister of Foreign Affairs, (b. 1927)
 March 22 – Patrick Doeplah, football striker, in Monrovia (b. 1990)
 May 18 – Antoinette Tubman, former First Lady (1948–1971), (b. 1914)
 September 17 – George MacDonald Sacko, football striker, in Newark, New Jersey, U. S. (b. 1936)
 November 14 – Peter Naigow, Vice President of Liberia (1991), in Guinea

References 

 
2010s in Liberia
Years of the 21st century in Liberia
Liberia
Liberia